Lengola (Lengora) is a Bantu language of the Democratic Republic of the Congo. It is not close to other Bantu languages. It may be closest to some of the D.30 languages in a group called "Lebonya".

References

Lebonya languages